Joe Walton Stadium is a 3,000-seat multi-purpose stadium in Moon Township, Pennsylvania. It is home to the Robert Morris University Colonials football team and men's and women's lacrosse team.  The facility opened in 2005 and is named for Colonials head football coach Joe Walton. The inaugural football game was played on September 17, 2005 when Robert Morris defeated Butler 49–13.  The team formerly played its home games at Moon Area High School's Moon Stadium.  The inaugural men's lacrosse game was played on March 5, 2005 when Robert Morris lost to Drexel 9–4.  The inaugural women's lacrosse game was played on March 24, 2005 when Robert Morris lost to Wagner 16–3.

Attendance records

See also
 List of NCAA Division I FCS football stadiums

References

External links
Robert Morris Colonials Athletic Facilities

College football venues
Sports venues in Pennsylvania
Multi-purpose stadiums in the United States
Robert Morris Colonials football
American football venues in Pennsylvania
2005 establishments in Pennsylvania
Sports venues completed in 2005
Former Major League Lacrosse venues
College lacrosse venues in the United States